ITV Parapentes (ITV Paragliders) is a French aircraft manufacturer based in Doussard and formerly in Épagny, Haute-Savoie. The company specializes in the design and manufacture of paragliders in the form of ready-to-fly aircraft. The company also constructs paramotor wings.

The company was founded in the 1980s and grew to be one of the largest paraglider manufacturers in the world.

In the early 2000s the company had a range of beginner gliders including the Opale and the Proxima, plus several intermediate gliders, such as the Diamant, Polaris and the Tomahawk. They also built a two-place glider for flight training, the Turquoise. All gliders were designed by Xavier Demoury.

Aircraft 

Summary of aircraft built by ITV:
ITV Asterion
ITV Awak
ITV Billy
ITV Bip Bip
ITV Boxer
ITV Bulldog
ITV Dakota
ITV Diamant
ITV Dolpo
ITV Fury
ITV Jedi
ITV Meteor
ITV Opale
ITV Papoose
ITV Pawnee
ITV Polaris
ITV Proxima
ITV Shakra
ITV Siam
ITV Stewart Tandem
ITV Tepee
ITV Thanka
ITV Tomahawk
ITV Tsampa
ITV Turquoise
ITV Vega

References

External links

Company old website location archives on Archive.org

Aircraft manufacturers of France
Ultralight aircraft
Paramotors
Paragliders
Companies based in Auvergne-Rhône-Alpes